A municipality is the basic administrative division in Kosovo and constitutes the only level of power in local governance. There are 38 municipalities in Kosovo; 27 of which have an Albanian ethnic majority, 10 Serb and 1 Turkish. After the 2013 Brussels Agreement, signed by the governments of Kosovo and Serbia, an agreement was made to create a Community of Serb Municipalities, which would operate within Kosovo's legal framework. Since 2013, the agreement has not been fulfilled by Kosovo's authorities, calling upon its constitution and "territorial integrity". Serbia does not recognize Kosovo as a sovereign state, but as an autonomous province according to its constitution.

List of Municipalities

Powers of municipalities

All municipalities have the following competences, as regulated by Law Nr. 03/L-040 of the Constitution of Kosovo:

 Local economic development.
 Urban and rural planning.
 Land use and development.
 Implementation of building regulations and building control standards.
 Local environmental protection.
 Provision and maintenance of public services and utilities, including water supply, sewers and drains, sewage treatment, waste management, local roads, local transport and local heating schemes.
 Local emergency response.
 Provision of public pre-primary, primary and secondary education, including registration and licensing of educational institutions, recruitment, payment of salaries and training of education instructors and administrators.
 Provision of public primary health care.
 Provision of family and other social welfare services, such as care for the vulnerable, foster care, child care, elderly care, including registration and licensing of these care centers, recruitment, payment of salaries and training of social welfare professionals.
 Public housing.
 Public health.
 Licensing of local services and facilities, including those related to entertainment, cultural and leisure activities, food, lodging, markets, street vendors, local public transportation and taxis.
 Naming of roads, streets and other public places.
 Provision and maintenance of public parks and spaces.
 Tourism.
 Cultural and leisure activities.
 Any matter which is not explicitly excluded from their competence nor assigned to other authorities.

Community of Serb Municipalities

Municipalities with Serb majorities have additional powers over the appointment of local police commanders, religious and cultural heritage sites within their boundaries; some of them have competences over universities and secondary health which in non-Serb-majority municipalities are a matter for central government (and, through the right of association of municipalities, even those Serb-majority municipalities which are not specifically given these powers may exercise them in association with those that do).

The 2013 Brussels Agreement signed by the Government of Kosovo and the Government of Serbia contains provisions for the formation of a Community of Serb Municipalities ( / Zajednica srpskih opština) It was expected to be created in 2015, but its formation has been postponed over conflicts about extent of powers.

Former municipalities
Between 1990 and 2000, in the Autonomous Province of Kosovo and Metohija, there were the following additional municipalities:
 Gora
 Opolje (1990–1992, later part of Prizren)
In 2000 both were merged into the new municipality of Dragash. The number of municipalities remained at 30 until 2005, when the new municipality of Malisheva was formed, by taking territories from the municipalities of Orahovac (District of Gjakova), Suva Reka (District of Prizren), Klina (District of Peja) and Drenas (District of Pristina).

See also 
 Administrative divisions of Kosovo
 Districts of Kosovo
 Cities and towns in Kosovo
 Populated places in Kosovo
 Populated places in Kosovo by Albanian name
 Community of Serb Municipalities

Notes

References

External links 

List of websites of the Municipalities of Kosovo
OSCE Municipal profiles
Association of Kosovo Municipalities

 
Subdivisions of Kosovo